Chen Hung-wen (born 3 February 1986) is a Taiwanese professional baseball pitcher for the Rakuten Monkeys of the Chinese Professional Baseball League (CPBL). He has played in the CPBL for the Chinatrust Brothers and Fubon Guardians.

Career

Chicago Cubs
Chen signed with the Chicago Cubs as an international free agent in 2007, signing for a $200,000 bonus. His professional career began in 2008 when he led the Daytona Cubs to the Florida State League finals. In 2009, Chen pitched to a 4.48 ERA with 98 strikeouts for the Double-A Tennessee Smokies. In 2010 for the Smokies and the Triple-A Iowa Cubs, Chen pitched to a cumulative 3.98 ERA with 96 strikeouts over 32 appearances. Chen began the season with Tennessee and Iowa, and in June 2011 he was loaned to the Piratas de Campeche of the Mexican League. Chen pitched to a 1.82 ERA with 46 strikeouts in 19 games before being returned to the Cubs organization in late August. Frustrated with his lack of opportunities, Chen did not report to Spring Training in 2012, and the Cubs released him on March 10, 2013.

Brother Elephants/Chinatrust Brothers
Chen joined the Brother Elephants, later rebranded as the Chinatrust Brothers of the Chinese Professional Baseball League for the 2013 season. In August 2014, Chen was sidelined with inflammation in his shoulder tendon, and upon his return from the disabled list he was utilized as a reliever. On August 10, 2017, Chen returned to being a starting pitcher.

Fubon Guardians
Chen joined the Fubon Guardians after the 2017 season. In 2019, Chen pitched to a stellar 1.70 ERA with 51 strikeouts in 50 games. In the 2020 season, Chen pitched to a 4.77 ERA with 46 strikeouts in 53 games.

Rakuten Monkeys
On January 3, 2023, Chen signed with the Rakuten Monkeys of the Chinese Professional Baseball League.

International career
He competed for the Taiwan national baseball team in the World Baseball Classic in 2009, 2013 and 2017.

He is the all-time losingest pitcher in World Baseball Classic history, with three losses accumulated over the 2009, 2013, and 2017 competitions.

References

External links
, or CPBL

1986 births
Living people
Arizona League Cubs players
Asian Games medalists in baseball
Asian Games silver medalists for Chinese Taipei
Baseball players at the 2010 Asian Games
Boise Hawks players
Brother Elephants players
CTBC Brothers players
Daytona Cubs players
Taiwanese expatriate baseball players in Mexico
Fubon Guardians players
Iowa Cubs players
Medalists at the 2010 Asian Games
Mexican League baseball pitchers
People from Hualien County
Peoria Chiefs players
Piratas de Campeche players
Taiwanese expatriate baseball players in the United States
Tennessee Smokies players
2009 World Baseball Classic players
2013 World Baseball Classic players
2015 WBSC Premier12 players
2017 World Baseball Classic players
Taiwanese expatriate baseball players in Australia